The Astronomy Tower of the Sorbonne is a tower at the Sorbonne University's Paris campus built to house an astronomical observatory for its students. The structure was erected during the reconstruction of the Sorbonne, between 1885 and 1901. The tower is 39 meters high, has an upper and lower dome, and includes several rooms. The upper dome houses the telescope, and the lower dome contains an optics workshop for amateurs to make mirrors (previously, a meridian circle was installed in that space). The tower is operated by the Société astronomique de France and is available for tours and amateur observations.

Telescopes 
The observatory originally had an equatorial mount telescope of 241 mm diameter and a 3,755 mm focal length constructed by the R. Mailhat company. The  instrument was transferred to the Paris Observatory in 1909.

In 1980, an equatorial mount refracting telescope of 153 mm diameter and 2,300 mm focal length was installed in the upper dome. The telescope is owned by the Société astronomique de France. It was built in 1935 and was originally installed in the Observatory of the rue Serpente on top of the society’s former headquarters at 28, rue Serpente, Paris.

See also
 List of observatories

References 

Astronomical observatories in France
1885 establishments in France
Astronomy in France